The 2019 FIA World Cup for Cross-Country Rallies was the 27th season of the FIA World Cup for Cross-Country Rallies; an annual competition for rally raid events for cars, buggies, side-by-sides, and trucks held in multiple countries.

Calendar
The 2019 edition of the world cup featured five cross country rallies. The shorter 'baja' style events are now included in their own international competition, the FIA World Cup for Cross-Country Bajas. Some events on the schedule were shared with the 2019 FIM Cross-Country Rallies World Championship.

The FIA awards the world cup to drivers, co-drivers, and teams competing in the T1 category; whilst drivers and teams in the T2 and T3 categories are awarded FIA cups. The T4 'truck' category is recognized, but not awarded any end-of-season cup or trophy.

Due to irreconcilable differences between the FIA and Turkmenistan, the Turkmen Desert Race was cancelled for 2019; thereby leaving the calendar with just four events.

Notable teams and drivers

Results

Overall

T2 category

T3 category

T4 category

Championship standings
In order to score points in the Cup classifications, competitors must register with the FIA before the entry closing date of the first rally entered.
Points system
 Points for final positions are awarded as per the following table:

FIA World Cup for Drivers, Co-Drivers, and Teams

Drivers' & Co-Drivers' championships

Teams' championship

FIA T2 Cup for Drivers and Teams

FIA T3 Cup for Drivers and Teams

References

External links 
 

Cross Country Rally World Cup
World Cup for Cross-Country Rallies
World Cup for Cross-Country Rallies